Illinois Route 130 is a north–south state highway in eastern Illinois. It runs from Illinois Route 1 in Grayville north to Interstate 74 in Urbana. Illinois 130 is the main north–south highway through Charleston, the home of Eastern Illinois University.

Route description 
Illinois 130 begins very near the Wabash River at Illinois 1 in Grayville. Traveling north, it overlaps Illinois Route 33 in Newton, U.S. Route 36 in Camargo and U.S. Route 150 in Urbana. It is also called High Cross Road in Urbana. Illinois 130 is an undivided two-lane surface state highway for its entire length.

History 
SBI Route 130 was what Illinois 130 is now from Albion north to Charleston. In March 1937, when Illinois 1 was moved to a new road further south, Illinois 130 was extended south to Illinois 1. In 1964, Illinois 130 was extended north to Mira Station, an unincorporated area south of Champaign in Champaign County. The highway was formerly county highways The University of Illinois Trail, with U and I superimposed, then the symbol of the University of Illinois.. In the 1980s it was moved to its present terminus, now running north from Philo to Urbana and along U.S. 150 to Interstate 74. There is a short 4-lane divided stretch from US 150 to I-74, the only 4-lane portion of Illinois 130.

IL 130A 

Illinois Route 130A was a spur of Illinois Route 130 during the 1930s. Initially, IL 130A used to be signed as IL 130 but it only acted like a spur route to Sainte Marie. IL 130A replaced a portion of that in 1931. It eventually got decommissioned in 1942. The route is now a local road known as both 600th Avenue and Embarras Street.

Major intersections

References

External links 

Illinois Highway Ends: Illinois Route 130

130
Transportation in Richland County, Illinois
Transportation in Cumberland County, Illinois
Transportation in Coles County, Illinois
Transportation in Douglas County, Illinois
Transportation in Champaign County, Illinois
Urbana, Illinois
Transportation in Edwards County, Illinois
Transportation in Jasper County, Illinois